Silene littorea is a species of flowering plant in the family Caryophyllaceae. The species is an annual plant.

The species has the gynodioecy–gynomonoecy sexual system. It is one of the most studied species with this sexual system.

Distribution 
The species is native to Morocco, Portugal, Spain The population of this species has been observed to be declining in Spain. In Spanish, the species goes by the common name  papamoscas marino.

References 

Flora of Morocco
Flora of Portugal
Flora of Spain
littorea